Plankənd is a village and municipality in the Gadabay Rayon of Azerbaijan.  It has a population of 1,031.  The municipality consists of the villages of Plankənd and Qalakənd.

References 

Populated places in Gadabay District